The Tamil Genocide by Sri Lanka: The Global Failure to Protect Tamil Rights Under International Law is a book by 
Francis Boyle on the final stages of the Sri Lankan Civil War and its war crimes. The United Nations, which has acknowledged its calamitous failures under the Responsibility to Protect is still trying to tally the numbers and apportion the blame, four years on: 40,000 to 70,000 civilians killed over five months of the final conflagration, the number the UN now accepts, though many argue the figure is far higher.

References

Sri Lankan Civil War books
2009 non-fiction books
Non-fiction books about genocide